Borough 3 is a central borough of Düsseldorf, the state capital of North Rhine-Westphalia, Germany and the city's most populous and one of its most diverse boroughs.

Stadtbezirk 3 covers an area of 24.71 square kilometres and (as of December 2020) has about 121,000 inhabitants. The northern quarters in close proximity to Borough 1 - like Biedermeier era Friedrichstadt and Oberbilk - have flowing transitions towards Stadtmitte, Düsseldorf's central business district. Hafen is in an ongoing urban regeneration of the old port, which creates ever new loft-style office buildings, convention venues, night clubs, trendy bars and restaurants. On the southern end of the borough, quarters like Volmerswerth and Flehe still manage to preserve their suburban, small-world character.

The borough borders with Düsseldorf boroughs 1 and 4 to the North, boroughs 2, 8 and 9 to the East and South-east and the river Rhine to the South and West. On the left Rhine side lies the city of Neuss.

Subdivisions 
Borough 3 is made up of eight Stadtteile (city parts):

Places of interest

Arts, Culture and Entertainment 
 Apollo Varieté
 Kunst im Tunnel (KiT)
 Kunstsammlung Nordrhein-Westfalen (Art Collection Northrhine-Westphalia) - K20 (Grabbeplatz) and K21 (Ständehaus)
 Philipshalle

Landmarks 
 Rheinturm telecommunication tower; at  tallest building in Düsseldorf with an observation deck
 Neuer Zollhof; office building, designed by architect Frank Gehry
 Colorium, office building designed by architect Will Alsop
 Landtag of North Rhine-Westphalia; state parliament
 Stadttor, state chancellery
 University of Düsseldorf with University Hospital
 Old St. Martin in Bilk, romanesque church from 10th century

Parks and open spaces 
 Botanischer Garten Düsseldorf, a modern botanical garden
 Südpark
 Südfriedhof

Transportation 
The borough is served by numerous railway stations and highway. Largest train station is Düsseldorf Hauptbahnhof, other stations include Düsseldorf Friedrichstadt, Düsseldorf Bilk, Düsseldorf Oberbilk and Düsseldorf Hamm as well as a dense net of both Düsseldorf Stadtbahn underground- and Rheinbahn tram-stations. While the eastern and northern quarters of the borough can be reached via Bundesautobahn 57 and Bundesstraße 1, the southern and western quarters become accessible via Bundesautobahn 46 and Bundesstraße 8.

Rhine bridges 
 Rheinkniebrücke
 Josef-Kardinal-Frings-Brücke
  Fleher Brücke

See also 
 Boroughs of Düsseldorf

References

External links 

 Official webpage of the borough 

!